John Parr (died 1798) was an English gun maker, Mayor of the Borough of Liverpool in 1773.

Life
He was the son of John Parr of Rainford, who married in 1713 Joan Horton, daughter of Joshua Horton of Chadderton. The family were gun makers and shipowners involved in the Atlantic slave trade.

In 1751 Parr was recruited as an agent for the Birmingham firm of Farmer & Galton, by James Farmer, partner of Samuel Galton Jr.. He took over a role selling guns on commission under John Hardman. In this business relationship with Farmer and Galton, he also took on the "battery trade", another aspect of the hinterland commerce dealing in small copper and brass items. In 1752 he was listed with Hardman as an African Company of Merchants founding member. The gun trade presented particular difficulties of long credit required by customers, and Galton chased Parr to collect payments. Up to the outbreak of the Seven Years' War in 1756, discounts for cash on guns were high.

In a 1766 directory of Liverpool, Parr appears as a gunsmith in Frederick Street. At the time when he was mayor in 1773, he lived in Water Street. Rioting broke out in Liverpool at the end of August 1775, when sailors employed in the Atlantic trade, then in a slump, objected to a cut in wages. In the aftermath, Parr supplied guns, ammunition and swords to Liverpool corporation.

The "tower gun" was a staple trade item at Old Calabar and generally in West Africa. It took its name, in effect a brand, from the supposition that such guns had been tested on the Tower of London's firing range. Commercial correspondence from 1788 mentions how Parr acquired old guns in Ireland, and had them reconditioned by workshops to be saleable in the African trade.

Parr was one of the manufacturers supplying French agents with guns, just before the outbreak of the French Revolutionary Wars. Galton, discussing the trade with John Mason who was in the pay of the Home Office, gave Parr most of the credit for importing Irish Ordnance fusils on behalf of the French. He died in 1798, aged 76. His will dated 1794 described extensive workshops and warehouses for the gun trade in Liverpool, in the area of Argyle Street where he lived, to Pitt Street.

Family
Parr married in 1756 Anne Wolstenholme (died 1765, aged 25), daughter of the Rev. Henry Wolstenholme (died 1771), rector of Liverpool. Parr moved into the Wolstenholme family residence in Ropewalks, which was in an area partially built up towards the end of the 17th century, and later when fashionable called Wolstenholme Square. The south side of the square was built up by 1765. His father-in-law left Parr land between Wolstenholme Square and Colquitt Street. Already in 1764 Parr had leased land north of RopeWorks, adjacent to Copperas Hill, but he never engaged in speculative building there.

The Parrs' children included:

John Owen Parr I, the eldest son, was in 1791 an insurance broker and merchant (1794) in London, at 11 Royal Exchange; and in 1799 was a member of Lloyd's of London. He suffered bankruptcy in 1800. He married in 1792 Elizabeth Mary Patrick, daughter of Thomas Patrick and Elizabeth Chase, who was a niece of Sir Richard Chase of Much Hadham and first cousin of Chase Price. Parr was in business with Thomas Chase Patrick, Elizabeth's brother, and they were involved together in the bankruptcy proceedings. Their son John Owen Parr II matriculated at Brasenose College, Oxford in 1815, graduating B.A. in 1818 and M.A. in 1850. He became vicar of Preston, Lancashire in 1840. Another son was Thomas Chase Parr (died 1883), a general in the Bombay Army.
Edward Parr (died 1848), married Anne Jane Hamilton, daughter of Arthur Hamilton of Wavertree.
The writer Wolstenholme Parr (1761/2–1845), who spent much time in Venice, and acquired the bulk of the papers of Pierre-François Hugues d'Hancarville. Some of d'Hancarville's work in French appeared in 1842, edited by Parr.
Joseph Wolstenholme Parr MD (1763–1810), who married in 1792 Althea Barton, daughter of the Manchester fustian manufacturer George Barton (1731–1789). He resided in Carmarthenshire, at Pentre Parr, Ffairfach near Llandeilo, and took an interest in copper mining. He had, c.1798, an alum and vitriol works on Parys Mountain.
Thomas Parr, merchant, married Mary Wood, daughter of Richard Wood.

Notes

Year of birth missing
1798 deaths
English merchants
Mayors of Liverpool